Ollie Johnson may refer to:

Ollie Johnson (basketball, born 1942), American basketball player, AAU All-American; University of San Francisco graduate
Ollie Johnson (basketball, born 1949), American basketball player, for NBA teams; Temple University graduate
Oli Johnson (born 1987), English footballer
the maternal grandfather of Dennis the Menace

See also
Ollie Johnston (1912–2008), American Disney animator
Oliver Johnson (disambiguation)